The following is a list of the CHUM Chart number-one singles of 1963.

See also
1962 in music

References

1963
Canada Chum
1963 in Canadian music